Ravi Vijaykumar Malimath (born on 25 May 1962) is an Indian Judge. Presently, he is Chief Justice of Madhya Pradesh High Court. He has served as the Acting Chief Justice of Himachal Pradesh High Court and Uttarakhand High Court and Judge of Himachal Pradesh High Court, Uttarakhand High Court and Karnataka High Court.

References 

1962 births
Indian judges
Living people
Chief Justices of the Madhya Pradesh High Court
Judges of the Himachal Pradesh High Court
Judges of the Karnataka High Court
Justices of the Uttarakhand High Court